On February 19–20, 1884, one of the largest and most widespread tornado outbreaks in American history occurred over the Southeastern United States. Known as the Enigma tornado outbreak due to the unknown number of total tornadoes, the outbreak produced the largest 24-hour total of killer tornadoes until the 1974 Super Outbreak on April 3–4. The precise number of tornadoes as well as fatalities incurred during the outbreak is unknown, but the death toll was variously estimated to range from 370–2,000 at the time. A reliable survey by the Signal Corps in 1889 located 182 fatalities, and a reanalysis by tornado researcher Thomas P. Grazulis in 1993 counted 178 deaths. Nonetheless, an inspection of newspaper reports and governmental studies published in the aftermath reveals successive, long-tracked tornado families striking Alabama, Georgia, Illinois, Indiana, Kentucky, Mississippi, North Carolina, South Carolina, Tennessee and Virginia, with an estimation of at least 37 tornadoes. Some events counted as tornadoes in initial studies such as those by John Park Finley were likely downbursts, especially in northern and northeastern portions of the outbreak.

The majority of reported tornado activity was seen across Alabama, Georgia, South Carolina and North Carolina, which were all struck severely by multiple waves of tornado families. In the Southeast, the outbreak began during the late morning in Mississippi, preceded by severe thunderstorms in Louisiana. Shortly thereafter, the outbreak widened and intensified, progressing from Alabama to Virginia between noon and midnight. According to an article appearing in the Statesville (NC) Landmark three days later, the damage tally in Georgia alone was estimated to be $1 million, in 1884 dollars. The outbreak also produced the deadliest individual tornado in North Carolina history, an F4 which swept through the Rockingham area, killing 23. Tabulations from 1884 estimate a total of $3–4 million in tornado damage (with an unknown amount of flood and other damage), with 10,000 structures destroyed.

Elsewhere, wind damage, flash floods and derecho-like effects were also reported in published accounts of the outbreak. Homes were swept away by water in Louisville, Kentucky, New Albany, Indiana, and Jeffersonville, Indiana, as well as in other towns along the Ohio River. Blizzard conditions occurred in the eastern Midwest.

Confirmed tornadoes
The ratings for these tornadoes were done by meteorologist tornado expert Thomas P. Grazulis and are not official ratings.

February 19 event

February 20 event

Polkton–Ansonville–Mangum–Pekin, North Carolina

This was the first of a number of destructive North Carolina storms. Detailed coverage in a Wadesboro-based newspaper provides an unusually (by 19th-century standards) precise survey of the movement and damage produced by three of those storms in the southern Piedmont of North Carolina. This storm first formed in southeastern Union County, from a supercell that had produced significant damage in South Carolina earlier. Most of the path of this storm was in rural areas, with injuries and major damage along Beaverdam Creek, south of Marshville in Union County, and along Brown Creek in Anson County, northeast of Polkton.

Significant damage also occurred in and around the towns of Polkton and Ansonville, where structures in both towns were widely damaged, with homes and farm buildings destroyed south of Ansonville. A total of four people were killed. Eyewitnesses in Polkton noted that the storm "crossed the railroad about a mile east of Polkton last night prostrating everything in its course. Could see the storm from Polkton by lightning, looked like a cloud of dense smoke and sounded like thunder.

Homes were also destroyed near Mangum in Richmond County and near Pekin in Montgomery County.

Pioneer Mills, North Carolina

This storm was preceded and followed by a wide area of downburst damage – with scattered areas of damage to farms and small structures reported across a wide area of southern Cabarrus County, eastern Mecklenburg County (northeast of Mint Hill) and the Goose Creek area of northwestern Union County.

The first tornado-specific damage occurred in the Pioneer Mills community between Harrisburg and Midland in Cabarrus County, where a mill was destroyed and estimated F2 damage was inflicted upon several residences. The storm passed within  of Albemarle; little damage was recorded elsewhere in Stanly County. Several poorly constructed buildings were destroyed along the Uwharrie River in Montgomery County, and damage to farms was widespread in the county. One person was killed. Downburst damage continued to southwest of Asheboro.

Pee Dee–Rockingham–Philadelphia–Manly, North Carolina

Spawned late in the outbreak, the storm which swept from Anson to Harnett Counties in North Carolina passed through the Rockingham area, and became the deadliest tornado in recorded North Carolina history. This storm first touched down east of the town of McFarlan, in southeastern Anson County. The storm produced little damage in Anson County, but caused two deaths south of Pee Dee.

Tracking to the northeast, it crossed the Pee Dee River into Richmond County and produced sporadic damage until just southeast of Rockingham. Extreme damage to pine forests was first noted just south of town. Strengthening considerably, the storm swept through the southeast edge of Rockingham, where large homes were destroyed to their foundations, and large hardwood trees were snapped at ground level.

The storm then tracked through what is now the town of Hoffman, before entering Moore County. Severe damage was again seen in the community of Manly (presently at the northeast corner of the city of Southern Pines). The storm then curved slightly to the east, dissipating into a wide area of downburst damage near the community of Johnsonville. A total of 23 people were killed.

An unusually detailed accounting of the storm's passage through Richmond County was provided two days later: a local resident undertook an informal, but detailed survey of the damage produced by the storm, and this account was published in an Anson County newspaper. This accounting establishes a steady southwest-to-northeast movement through the county, with a number of buildings – sharecropper cabins, large homes, and a mill – swept away along the path. The surveyor noted that:

Trees were taken up by the roots and hurled with fearful rapidity through the air and those not uprooted had all the bark taken off. The scene after the storm, particularly the position of the prostrate trees, indicated a convergence toward the center, as if a vacuum was created there and the wind rushed in from either side to fill it.

A second, detailed survey of the path was made 10 days later by J. A. Holmes; his findings were published in the Elisha Mitchell Scientific Society journal for 1884.

Eyewitnesses reported large hail and intense lightning displays preceding the storm. Moving to the northeast, away from Rockingham, the storm also produced severe damage in the Keyser and Manly communities, along the southeast edge of Moore County.

See also
List of North American tornadoes and tornado outbreaks

Notes

References

F4 tornadoes by date
 ,1884-02-19
Tornadoes of 1884
Tornadoes in Alabama
Tornadoes in Georgia (U.S. state)
Tornadoes in Illinois
Tornadoes in Indiana
Tornadoes in Kentucky
Tornadoes in Mississippi
Tornadoes in North Carolina
Tornadoes in South Carolina
Tornadoes in Tennessee
Tornadoes in Virginia
Concord, North Carolina
Richmond County, North Carolina
1884 natural disasters in the United States
February 1884 events